Funchess is a surname of German origin, and an Americanized variant of Funccius. Notable people with the surname include: 

David Funchess (1947–1986), American war veteran and convicted murderer
Devin Funchess (born 1994), American football player
Tom Funchess (born 1944), American football player

References

Surnames of German origin
Americanized surnames